Peter Buchanan may refer to:

 Peter Buchanan (Royal Navy officer) (1925–2011)
 Peter Buchanan (architect) (born 1942), architect, urbanist, writer and exhibition curator
 Peter Buchanan (footballer, born 1915) (1915–1977), Scottish football player (Chelsea FC, Fulham FC, Brentford FC, national team)
 Peter Buchanan (footballer, born 1938), Scottish football player and club president (Queen's Park)
 Peter Buchanan (judge), judge of the Supreme Court of Victoria, Australia
 Peter Buchanan (rugby union) (1889–?), rugby union player who represented Australia
 Pete Buchanan, a character in Hollyoaks

See also
 Peter Buchanan-Smith (born 1972), designer, teacher and entrepreneur